Silver Sun is a 2012 album by the Japanese rock band Nothing's Carved in Stone released on August 15, 2012.

Track listing

References 

2012 albums
Epic Records albums
Sony Music Entertainment Japan albums
Nothing's Carved in Stone albums